Le Père Noël is a 2014 French-Belgian comedy film directed by Alexandre Coffre and starring Tahar Rahim and Victor Cabal.

Plot 
Six-year-old Antoine wishes for Christmas, in addition to lots of toys, to take Santa Claus on his sleigh ride so that he can visit his papa, who lives on a star in heaven - at least that's what his mother had always told him. When Antoine wakes up on Christmas night and looks up at the evening sky, a burglar suddenly lands on his balcony. Since he disguised himself as Santa Claus, the boy is convinced that his wish will now come true. But the man in the red and white coat simply climbs on to the next floor without admitting any presents. Of course that is not possible and Antoine climbs afterwards. The burglar tries everything to get rid of the boy, but he clings to him like a burr. When "Santa Claus" is unexpectedly checked by the police, he can quickly put his booty (coins and jewelry) in the boy's backpack so that he is not exposed. So the two stay together for the next few hours and the unequal couple moves through wintry Paris. Antoine is even "allowed" to help Santa Claus, because after a fall, "Santa's" climbing skills are limited and he uses the ignorant child for his own purposes. He owes someone money, which is why he inevitably uses this ruse. Antoine of course likes to be able to help "Santa Claus" and says he only has to steal the things so that Santa's sleigh can fly again. After a few break-ins, the couple threatens to be discovered and Antoine comes to the conclusion that this Santa Claus is probably not real after all. Antoine insists on bringing the things back. The burglar has developed a certain relationship with the boy over the course of the night and does not want to disappoint him, and since he actually stole everything because of his debts, he has an idea. He lures the man whom he had referred to Antoine as Knecht Ruprecht into a trap. He dumps the stolen goods under the Christmas tree of one of the families he stole with Antoine's help. This is now arrested by the police and "Santa Claus" brings Antoine back home, where his mother is still sleeping and had not noticed the absence of her boy.

Days later, Antoine goes to a toy store with his mother and meets the "burglar Santa Claus" there, but this time without a coat. They both look at each other and smile. Christmas can be so magical!

Cast 
 Tahar Rahim as Père Noël
 Victor Cabal as Antoine 
 Annelise Hesme as Antoine's Mother
 Michaël Abiteboul as The bogeyman
 Charlie Dupont as The robbed
 Philippe Rebbot as Camille 
 Amélie Glenn as Marie
 Steve Tran as Taxi driver

See also
 List of Christmas films

References 
Cinema.dewrote: "Little Antoine befriends Santa Claus - not realizing that the man in red is a burglar (Tahar Rahim," A Prophet ") ... Great fun, more for adults."

Filmdienst.de judged: "Contemplative entertainment film about the miracle of an" impossible friendship "between a skilled thief with a heart and a dreamy boy."

External links 
 

2014 films
2014 comedy films
2010s Christmas comedy films
2010s French-language films
Belgian comedy films
French Christmas comedy films
Films set in Paris
Films scored by Klaus Badelt
French-language Belgian films
2010s French films